Orphanodendron bernalii is a species of legume in the family Fabaceae. It is found only in Colombia.

References

Caesalpinioideae
Endemic flora of Colombia
Taxonomy articles created by Polbot
Taxa named by James Walter Grimes
Taxa named by Rupert Charles Barneby

Least concern plants